James Butler Bowlin (January 16, 1804 – July 19, 1874) was a U.S. Representative from Missouri. Born in Spotsylvania County, Virginia near Fredericksburg, Bowlin took an apprenticeship to a trade but abandoned it to teach at a school. He received a classical education and moved to Lewisburg, Virginia in 1825. Bowlin studied law and was admitted to the bar in 1822, commencing his practice in Greenbrier County. He moved to St. Louis, Missouri in 1833 and continued the practice of law. Bowlin also established the Farmers and Mechanics' Advocate. He owned slaves.

Bowlin served as Chief Clerk of the State House of Representatives in 1836. He served as member of the Missouri House of Representatives in 1836 and 1837, was appointed district attorney for St. Louis in 1837, and was an unsuccessful candidate for the State House of Representatives in 1838. Bowlin was elected judge of the criminal court in 1839 and served until his resignation in 1842.

Bowlin was elected as a Democrat to the Twenty-eighth and to the three succeeding Congresses (March 4, 1843 – March 3, 1851). He served as chairman of the Committee on Private Land Claims (Twenty-ninth Congress), Committee on Public Lands (Thirty-first Congress). He was an unsuccessful candidate for reelection in 1850 to the Thirty-second Congress.

Bowlin was appointed Minister Resident to New Granada by President Pierce December 13, 1854. He was appointed commissioner to Paraguay by President Buchanan September 9, 1858, and served until February 10, 1859. Afterwards, Bowlin resumed the practice of law. He died in St. Louis, July 19, 1874, and was interred in Bellefontaine Cemetery.

References

1804 births
1874 deaths
People from Spotsylvania County, Virginia
Democratic Party members of the United States House of Representatives from Missouri
Democratic Party members of the Missouri House of Representatives
Ambassadors of the United States to Colombia
American slave owners
19th-century American diplomats
19th-century American politicians